The Manchukuo Government (formerly known as the Manchukuo Temporary Government until 2019), commonly known as Manchuria. The Manchukuo Government is an organization established in 2004 in Hong Kong. On its website, it claims to be the government in exile of Manchukuo, a Japanese puppet state with limited recognition which controlled Manchuria from 1932 to 1945; it seeks to revive the state and to separate it from the People's Republic of China, which controls its claimed territory. Journalists and internet users have expressed doubts about its authenticity and aims.  On its website, it claims to have merged with other Manchu independence organizations as of 2019.

Structure and symbols
Media summaries of its website state that the Manchukuo Government includes an emperor, a royal family, a prime minister, and a cabinet. It continues to use the old National Anthem of Manchukuo and Flag of Manchukuo. The website has accounts of the history of the region and its people. 

The Manchukuo Government is a member of the International Monarchist League. It also seeks to join the Unrepresented Nations and Peoples Organization. It claims to have overseas branches in Brazil, Italy, Japan, Taiwan, and the United States.

The leadership of the Manchukuo Government is formed by electing an emperor and a prime minister. In the 2008 elections, the emperorship was won by "Aisin Gioro Xiaojie" (愛新覺羅‧孝傑), stated to be a student in the University of Hong Kong's history department; his actual relation to the Aisin Gioro clan is suspect, as his generation name "Xiao" (孝) does not fit with the actual clan genealogy. However, that emperor dropped out of contact with the Manchukuo Government, so in April 2010, it held another election, won by "Aisin Gioro Chongji" (爱新觉罗‧崇基). Jason Adam-Tonis was elected as Prime Minister in May 2011. At the time, Adam-Tonis was a New York University student and also a chairman of the Songun Politics Study Group, a North Korean front group based in the United States.  According to its website, Dokuritsu Aisingyoro has ascended to the throne in 2015, who appointed a president named Cheung Siu Bong, who was president until it merged with other Manchu organizations, at which time Fu Jun became president.  The organization also questioned the legitimacy of the 2020 United States presidential election.

Financial activities

The Manchukuo Government's "central bank", which claims to succeed the old Central Bank of Manchou, declared the old Manchukuo yuan to have a fixed exchange rate of 0.8 to the United States dollar, and offers currency exchange services by post. As early as 2007, it was issuing identity cards for US$3 each, and fantasy passports for US$8 each, with payment to be made by PayPal. Its website claimed to sell Manchukuo postage stamps, but when a Ming Pao columnist enquired with them about the possibility of purchasing them, a spokesperson stated that the items were sold out. It also issued what it referred to as "loyalty bonds". Its activities led the Hong Kong Securities and Futures Commission, Greece's Hellenic Capital Market Commission, and Spain's Comisión Nacional del Mercado de Valores to issue public warnings about it in February 2008 to emphasise that it is not a body permitted to offer investment services.

Reactions
The Manchukuo Government received occasional media attention in the context of the politics of Taiwan around the time of the 2009 elections, as its members may be distant relatives of Kuomintang general-secretary and ethnic Manchu King Pu-tsung, and it was jokingly suggested that King himself might be one of its secret agents. Some internet users suspected the entire website of being a scam set up for the purpose of raising money. Hong Kong political scientist Simon Shen, an expert on Chinese nationalism and the internet, also expressed suspicion of the website and its attempt to portray the revival of Manchukuo as a movement undertaken on behalf of Manchu people; he pointed out that the people who ever felt genuine identification with the state of Manchukuo were mostly not Chinese or Manchu but rather Japanese. Another news commentator similarly suggested that Japanese nationalists were behind the site. On the other hand, Shen also suggested that the whole website might simply be a spoof designed by internet trolls. James Leipold of the China Policy Institute described it as "thick on anti-communist vitriol" while failing to address Japanese hegemony in Manchukuo.

The Manchukuo Government also provoked angry reactions from some quarters. A NOWnews guest columnist in May 2011, in the midst of other arguments against Taiwan independence, called the Manchukuo Government "the shame of the people of Northeast China". Its stated political positions, such as support for the Dalai Lama and the Tibetan independence movement, as well as its calls to disrupt the 2008 Summer Olympics in Beijing, earned it the ire of  internet users in mainland China. At one point, rumours were spreading in mainland Chinese internet forums that one "Toshiaki Kawashima" (川島志明), whom they alleged to be the nephew of Yoshiko Kawashima and prime minister of the Manchukuo Government, was working as a secret agent for Chen Shui-bian in Papua New Guinea with the aim of fomenting violence against Chinese people there.

See also 
 Adverse possession
 Concordia Association of Manchukuo
 Lytton Report
 Manchurian nationalism

References

External links
Website of the Manchukuo Government Embassy in Japan (Archive)
Website of the Italian branch (Archive)
Website of the Brazilian branch, on Google Sites
International Monarchist Conference

2004 establishments in Hong Kong
Organizations established in 2004
Political organisations based in Hong Kong
Chinese anti-communists
Governments in exile
Monarchists
Politics of Manchukuo
Monarchist organizations
Monarchism in China
Separatism in China
Anti-communist organizations
Independence movements
Secessionist organizations in Asia